Schweppes is a beverage brand that originated in the Republic of Geneva; it is made, bottled and distributed worldwide by multiple international conglomerates, depending on licensing and region, that manufacture and sell soft drinks. Schweppes was one of the earliest forms of a soft drink, originally being regular soda water created in 1783. Today, various drinks other than soda water bear the Schweppes brand name, including various types of lemonade and ginger ales.

The company has held the British royal warrant since 1836 and was the official sponsor of Prince Albert's Great Exhibition in Hyde Park, London in 1851.

History

In the late 18th century, German-Genevan scientist Johann Jacob Schweppe developed a process to manufacture bottled carbonated mineral water based on the discoveries of English chemist Joseph Priestley. Schweppe founded the Schweppes Company in Geneva in 1783 to sell carbonated water. In 1792, he moved to London to develop the business there. In 1843, Schweppes commercialised Malvern Water at the Holywell Spring in the Malvern Hills, which was to become a favourite of the British Royal Family until parent company Coca-Cola closed the historic plant in 2010 to local outcry.

In 1969, the Schweppes Company merged with Cadbury to become Cadbury Schweppes. After acquiring many other brands in the ensuing years, the company was split in 2008, with its US beverage unit becoming Keurig Dr Pepper and separated from its global confectionery business (now part of Mondelez International). Keurig Dr Pepper is the current owner of the Schweppes trademark in Canada and United States.

The Coca-Cola Company owns the Schweppes brand in several territories, including 21 European countries. In a further 22 European countries, the brand is owned by Schweppes International Limited (a subsidiary of Suntory).

In China, Hong Kong and Taiwan, Swire's subsidiary Swire Coca-Cola produces Schweppes branded beverages.

The Japanese Asahi Group bought Schweppes Australia in 2008 from Cadbury, and owns the trademark in Australia.

Mainstay Schweppes products include ginger ale (1870), bitter lemon (1957), and tonic water (the first carbonated tonic – 1871).

Marketing

During the 1920s and 1930s, the artist William Barribal created a range of posters for Schweppes. In 1945, the advertising agency S.T.Garland Advertising Service Ltd., London coined the word "Schweppervescence", which was first used the following year. Thereafter it was used extensively in advertisements produced by Garlands, who sold copyright of this word to the Schweppes Company for £150 five years later when they relinquished the account.

An ad campaign in the 1950s and 1960s featured a real-life veteran British naval officer named Commander Whitehead, who described the product's bubbly flavour (effervescence) as evanescence. Comedian Benny Hill also appeared in a series of Schweppes TV commercials in the 1960s.

Another campaign in the 1950s and 1960s, "Schweppeshire", was written by Stephen Potter, the inventor of gamesmanship.

Another campaign, voiced by British actor William Franklyn, made use of onomatopoeia in their commercials: "Schhh… You know who." after the sound of the gas escaping as one opens the bottle.

Other ad campaigns featured a leopard named Clive, voiced by Kelsey Grammer and Stephen Fry.

References

External links

Schweppes History Movie - 13 minute video on the history of Schweppes

British Royal Warrant holders
Food and drink companies established in 1783
Ginger ale
Keurig Dr Pepper brands
Coca-Cola brands
Suntory
Soft drinks manufacturers